Josie Morrison (born February 2, 1994) is a Canadian speed skater.

Career

2018 Winter Olympics
In January 2018, Morrison was named to Canada's 2018 Olympic team.

Records

Personal records

References

External links
 Profile of Josie Morrison at PyeongChang2018.com

1994 births
Living people
Canadian female speed skaters
Speed skaters from Edmonton
Speed skaters at the 2018 Winter Olympics
Olympic speed skaters of Canada